The Unknown Soldier is a 1926 American silent drama film directed by Renaud Hoffman, written by Richard Schayer and James J. Tynan, and starring Charles Emmett Mack, Marguerite De La Motte, Henry B. Walthall, Claire McDowell, and George Cooper. It was released on May 30, 1926, by Producers Distributing Corporation.

Plot
The plot involves an American soldier heroically dying alone during World War I with a faint suggestion that he may be interred in the Tomb of the Unknown Soldier, which had been dedicated in 1921.

Cast

Reception
The film was shown at a Los Angeles theater with a happy ending where De La Motte's character Mary stood at an alter for a mythical marriage and at the end her soldier Fred appears. A second version was later shown where the soldier never returns, leaving the young woman standing alone in a fade out, which patrons of the theater preferred. Director Renaud Hoffman stated that the later version was what he intended, and wanted it shown that way nationwide.

Preservation
Prints of The Unknown Soldier survive in the Library of Congress, UCLA Film and Television Archive, and in a foreign archive.

References

External links

Review and stills at Great War Fiction

1926 films
American silent feature films
American black-and-white films
1920s English-language films
1926 drama films
Silent American drama films
Producers Distributing Corporation films
Films directed by Renaud Hoffman
1920s American films
Films with screenplays by Richard Schayer
American World War I films